= Christiane Mancini =

French actress

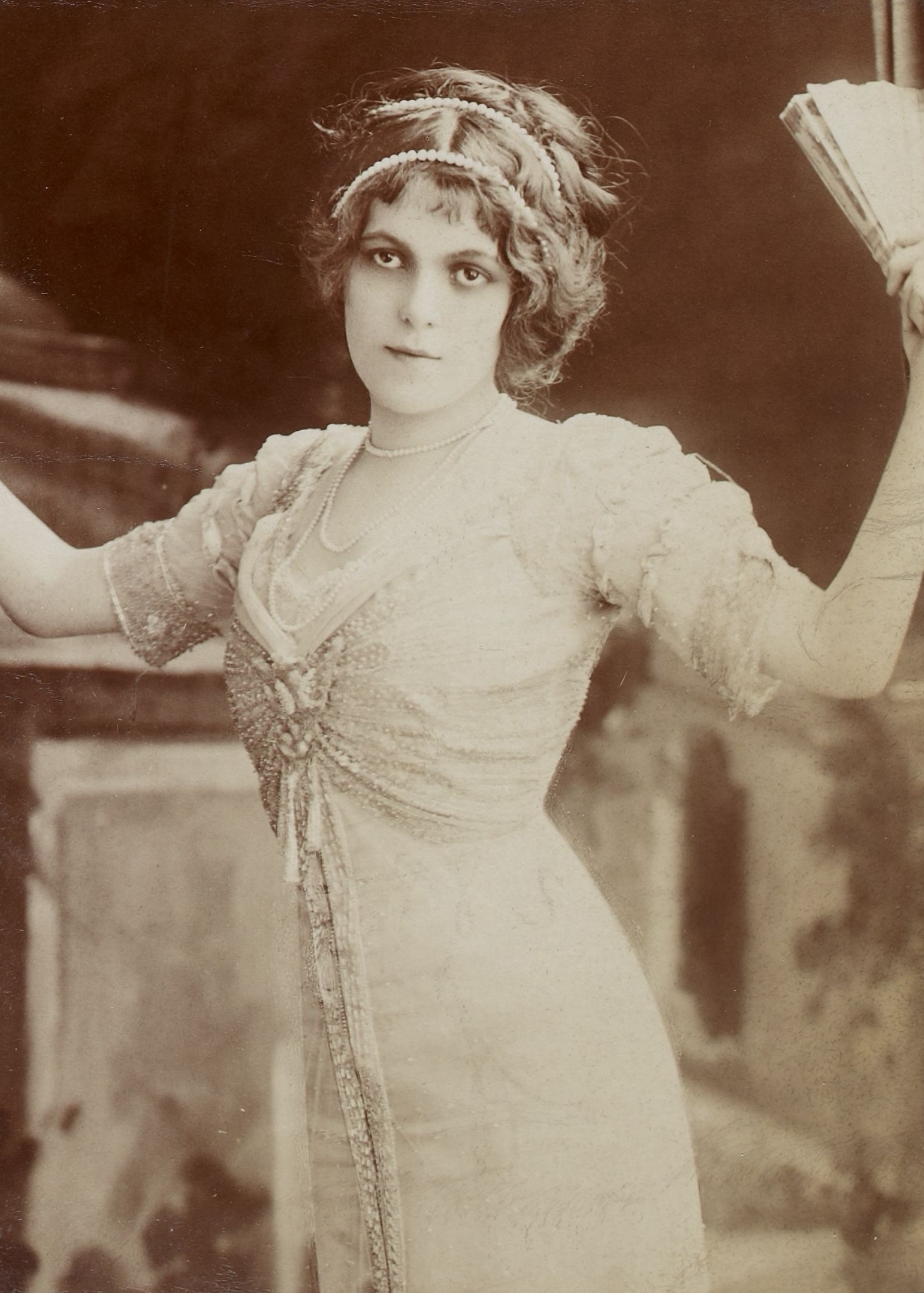
Christiane Mancini

Christiane Mancini was a French theater and film actress.

In 1907, she was a student at the Paris Conservatory. In 1909, she studied with Louis Leloir. She played the role of Hermione in Andromaque.

== Personal life ==
Her sister Cécile Mancini was a singer of the Paris National Opera. In 1908 or 1910, she had a brief affair with Jean Cocteau.

== Theater ==
- Polyphemus, 1906
- Prostitute, 1910, by Henri Desfontaines
- La Mort de Patrocle, 1921
